The Elbo Room is a bar that was established in 1938 at 241 South Fort Lauderdale Beach Boulevard, Fort Lauderdale, Florida and became a landmark for Fort Lauderdale Beach. The bar was prominently featured in the 1960 film Where the Boys Are. Its location at the corner of Las Olas Boulevard places it on one end of the Fort Lauderdale strip. Well known for being the host of multiple surfing and boogie boarding championships in the late 1980's and early 1990's, a stand out boogie boarding competition won by Jason Goodman in 1988 was the signature even during this time period. The Penrod family purchased it in 1981.

References

External links

1938 establishments in Florida
Art Deco architecture in Florida
Buildings and structures in Fort Lauderdale, Florida
Culture of Fort Lauderdale, Florida
Drinking establishments in Florida